The No Rest for the Wicked Tour was a tour by Ozzy Osbourne in 1988 and 1989, supporting his album No Rest for the Wicked.

Overview

Background
Geezer Butler joined the band for the tour.

Pre-tour

North America (1st leg)
Anthrax opened for the band on November 18, 1988.

Asia leg

Europe leg
19 April 1989, Zofingen, Switzerland, Supporting Act: U.D.O. (Ozzy's show cancelled due to illness)

North America (final leg)
White Lion and Vixen opened this leg.

Moscow Music Peace Festival
Ozzy Osbourne headlines the Moscow Music Peace Festival on August 13, 1989.

Setlist

Songs played overall
"I Don't Know"
"Flying High Again"
"Mr Crowley"
"Demon Alcohol"
"Over the Mountain"
"Believer"
"Shot in the Dark"
"Bloodbath in Paradise" [and Zakk Wylde guitar solo]
"Sweet Leaf" (Black Sabbath cover)
"War Pigs" (Black Sabbath cover)
"Tattooed Dancer" [and Randy Castillo drum solo]
"Fire in the Sky"
"Miracle Man"
"Suicide Solution"
"Killer of Giants"
"Iron Man" (Black Sabbath cover) and "Crazy Train" [Encore]
"Bark at the Moon"
"Close My Eyes Forever" (Lita Ford cover)
"Paranoid" (Black Sabbath cover)

Typical setlist (1988–1989)
"I Don't Know"
"Flying High Again"
"Mr. Crowley"
"Shot in the Dark"
"Bloodbath in Paradise" [and Zakk Wylde guitar solo]
"Sweet Leaf" (Black Sabbath cover)
"War Pigs" (Black Sabbath cover)
"Tattooed Dancer" [and Randy Castillo drum solo]
"Miracle Man"
"Suicide Solution"
"Iron Man" (Black Sabbath cover) and "Crazy Train" [Encore]
"Bark at the Moon"
"Paranoid" (Black Sabbath cover)

Europe
"Bark at the Moon"
"Suicide Solution"
"Over the Mountain"
"Fire in the Sky"
"Mr Crowley"
"Demon Alcohol"
"Shot in the Dark"
"I Don't Know"
"Flying High Again"
"Bloodbath in Paradise" [and Zakk Wylde guitar solo]
"Miracle Man"
"Sweet Leaf" (Black Sabbath cover)
"War Pigs" (Black Sabbath cover)
"Tattooed Dancer" [and Randy Castillo drum solo]
"Iron Man" (Black Sabbath cover) and "Crazy Train"
"Paranoid" (Black Sabbath cover) [Encore]

Moscow Music Peace Festival
"I Don't Know"
"Shot in the Dark" 
"Suicide Solution" 
"Tattooed Dancer" 
"Flying High Again"
"Miracle Man"
"Sweet Leaf" (Black Sabbath cover)
"War Pigs" (Black Sabbath cover)
"Crazy Train"
"Paranoid" (Black Sabbath cover) [Encore]

Tour dates

Personnel

1987–1988
 Ozzy Osbourne – Lead vocals
 Zakk Wylde – Guitar
 Phil Soussan – Bass
 Randy Castillo – Drums
 John Sinclair – Keyboards

1988
 Ozzy Osbourne – Vocals
 Zakk Wylde – Guitar
 Bob Daisley – Bass
 Randy Castillo – Drums
 John Sinclair – Keyboards

1988–1989
 Ozzy Osbourne – Vocals
 Zakk Wylde – Guitar
 Geezer Butler – Bass
 Randy Castillo – Drums
 John Sinclair – Keyboards

References

Ozzy Osbourne concert tours
1987 concert tours
1988 concert tours
1989 concert tours